Keiko is a 1979 Japanese film directed by Claude Gagnon. It won the Special Award at the 1979 Hochi Film Awards.

Cast
Junko Wakashiba as Keiko
Akiko Kitamura as Kazuyo
Takuma Ikeuchi as Masaru
Toshio Hashimoto as Terayama
Nobuo Nakanishi as Noguchi

See also
List of lesbian, gay, bisexual or transgender-related films

References

External links

1979 films
Japanese LGBT-related films
Lesbian-related films
Films directed by Claude Gagnon
1970s Japanese films